Herman Otten (born July 13, 1966) is an American politician and a Republican member of the South Dakota House of Representatives representing District 6 since January 11, 2013. Otten was formerly the mayor of Tea, South Dakota.

Elections
2012 With District 6 incumbent Republican Representatives Brock Greenfield and Burt Tulson both redistricted to District 2, Otten ran in the four-way June 5, 2012 Republican Primary and placed second with 609 votes (26.6%); in the four-way November 6, 2012 General election, Otten took the first seat with 5,739 votes (36.28%) and fellow Republican nominee Isaac Latterell took the second seat ahead of Democratic nominees Joseph Weis and Michael Jauron.

References

External links
Official page at the South Dakota Legislature
 

Place of birth missing (living people)
Living people
Mayors of places in South Dakota
Republican Party members of the South Dakota House of Representatives
People from Lincoln County, South Dakota
1966 births
21st-century American politicians